Fairplay is an unincorporated community in Adair County, Kentucky, United States.  Its elevation is 984 feet (300 m).

The community was so named on account of the fairness characterized by first settlers in all of their dealings.

References

Unincorporated communities in Adair County, Kentucky
Unincorporated communities in Kentucky